Hotel La Perla (Spanish: Gran Hotel La Perla) is a  five-star hotel in Pamplona, Spain and is located in the Plaza del Castillo (Castle Square), with one side facing Estafeta Street, one of the main routes in the Running of the Bulls. The balconies of the hotel are among the most coveted sites from which to view the event.

History

Opened on June 5 of 1881, it is the city's oldest hotel, and the oldest still in operation in the country. It was originally named Fonda [a] La Perla. The original owners were Miguel and Teresa Graz. He was a chef. She was from Burguete, a village in the Pyrenees. A few months after being established, the hotel moved a few doors down to its current location.

During a major cholera epidemic in Pamplona in the summer of 1885, the hotel was the only establishment that dared to stay open. It provided food to the military hospital for infectious diseases. Miguel died of cholera during the epidemic, after which time Teresa continued to operate the business.

In 2007, the hotel was completely renovated.

Famous guests

The hotel was popularized by having many notable guests, including Orson Welles, Charles Chaplin, George Gissing or Pablo Sarasate. In the studies about Hemingway, author of The Sun Also Rises, and in popular lore it is sometimes mistakenly identified as the model for the novel's Hotel Montoya. Actually, Hotel Montoya was inspired by Juanito Quintana's hotel.

References

External links

 Official website

Hotels in Spain
Buildings and structures in Pamplona
1881 establishments in Spain
Hotels established in 1881
Hotel buildings completed in 1881